Gari Sarab (also Romanized as Garī Sarāb) is a village in Kakasharaf Rural District, in the Central District of Khorramabad County, Lorestan Province, Iran. As of the 2006 census, its population was 42, with 11 families.

References 

Towns and villages in Khorramabad County